Christmas Crossfire is a 2020 German comedy film directed by Detlev Buck, written by Martin Behnke and Detlev Buck and starring Kostja Ullmann, Alli Neumann and Sascha Alexander Gersak.

Cast 
 Kostja Ullmann as Samuel
 Alli Neumann as Edda
 Sascha Alexander Gersak as Herrmann
 Sophia Thomalla as Katja
 Merlin Rose as Rudi
 Peter Kurth as Rainer
 Detlev Buck as Sigi Köhler
 Anika Mauer as Antje Köhler
 Frederic Linkemann as Frank
 Bernd Hölscher as Wolf
 Karsten Mielke as Norbert
 Malte Thomsen as Ronny
 Roman Schomburg as Thoralf
 Jakob Schmidt as Steffen
 Steffen Scheumann as Bernd

References

External links
 
 

2020 films
2020 comedy films
German-language Netflix original films
German comedy films
2020s German-language films
Films directed by Detlev Buck
German Christmas comedy films
2020s Christmas comedy films